Fles or FLES may refer to:

People
Three generations of a Jewish-Dutch-American family:
 Louis Fles, Dutch businessman and activist (father of Barthold Fles and George Fles)
 Barthold Fles, Dutch-American literary agent (son of Louis Fles)
 George Fles, Dutch victim of the Great Purge (son of Louis Fles, father of Michael John Fles)
 Michael John Fles, American poet and musician (son of George Fles)

Other uses
 De Koninklijke Porceleyne Fles, Dutch earthenware factory
 Language immersion, also known as Foreign Languages in Elementary Schools (FLES) program

See also

 
 FLE (disambiguation)